Ashish Kumar Yadav is an Indian politician and a member of the Sixteenth Legislative Assembly of Uttar Pradesh in India. He represents the Etah constituency of Uttar Pradesh and is a member of the Samajwadi Party political party. Now he is the member of legislative  council who represents Etah-mainpuri-mathura constituency.

Early life and  education
Yadav was born in Etah district. He is educated till twelfth grade (alma mater not known).

Political career
Yadav has been a MLA for one term. He represented the Etah constituency and is a member of the Samajwadi Party political party. 
He joined Bhartiya Janta party (joined March 2022).

Posts held

See also

 Etah (Assembly constituency)
 Sixteenth Legislative Assembly of Uttar Pradesh
 Uttar Pradesh Legislative Assembly

References 

Samajwadi Party politicians
Uttar Pradesh MLAs 2012–2017
People from Etah district
1984 births
Living people